Kevin Wayne Higgins (born January 22, 1967) is an American college baseball coach and former professional catcher. He is the associate head baseball coach at the University of Nevada, Las Vegas. Higgins was an outstanding collegiate infielder earning first team all America and first team all conference honors at second base for Arizona State University. Higgins had an incredible batting average of .361 which led the number one ranked Sun Devils to the College World Series Championship game against Stanford University in 1988. The Padres then converted Higgins to catcher when he got to the minors. After spending most of his career in the minors, he made his big league debut against the St. Louis Cardinals on May 29, 1993 going 1 for 4 with a hit and driving in 2 runs. He hit no home runs in 71 game for the Padres and only drove in thirteen runs, making his last career start on October 3, 1993. He then spent the 1994 season playing for the Padres Triple AAA team. He then retired from baseball altogether after the season and has not played ball since.

External links

1967 births
Living people
Arizona State Sun Devils baseball players
Baseball players from California
Los Angeles Harbor Seahawks baseball players
Major League Baseball catchers
San Diego Padres players
All-American college baseball players
UNLV Rebels baseball coaches
Southern Nevada Coyotes baseball coaches
Las Vegas Stars (baseball) players
Wichita Wranglers players
Riverside Red Wave players
Spokane Indians players
Alaska Goldpanners of Fairbanks players